The RENAMO-Electoral Union (RENAMO-União Electoral) is an alliance of political parties in Mozambique, led by the Mozambican National Resistance (Resistência Nacional Moçambicana) of Afonso Dhlakama.

In the parliamentary election held on 1–2 December 2004, the alliance received 29.7% of the popular vote and won 90 out of 250 seats. Its presidential candidate, Afonso Dhlakama, won 31.7% of the popular vote.

Aside from RENAMO, other parties in the alliance are:
Independent Alliance of Mozambique (Aliança Independente de Moçambique)
Mozambican Nationalist Movement (Movimento Nacionalista Moçambicano)
National Convention Party (Partido de Convenção Nacional)
National Unity Party (Partido de Unidade Nacional)
Front of Patriotic Action (Frente de Ação Patriotica)
People's Party of Mozambique (Partido Popular de Moçambique)
United Front of Mozambique (Frente Unida de Moçambique)

Political parties in Mozambique
Political party alliances in Africa
RENAMO